Arthur Henry Hobbs (born c.1923– 1975) was a British football administrator who was described as the 'father of women's football' in the United Kingdom.

Hobbs was instrumental in starting the Women's Football Association, and was its first secretary in 1969. Hobbs earlier ran the successful Deal International Tournament.

References

1975 deaths
English sports executives and administrators
Year of birth uncertain